Myra Barry (born 30 June 1957) is a former Irish Fine Gael politician who served as a Teachta Dála (TD) from 1979 to 1987. 

A national school teacher by profession, she trained at St Patrick's College, Dublin. She was first elected to Dáil Éireann as a Fine Gael TD following a by-election in 1979 for the Cork North-East constituency, following the death of Fianna Fáil TD Seán Brosnan. It was one of two by-elections in County Cork on the same day, both of which Fianna Fáil lost. The double defeat in Jack Lynch's native county was a factor in Lynch's resignation on 5 December 1979 as Taoiseach and leader of Fianna Fáil.

Her father Richard Barry was a sitting TD in the same constituency at the time of the by-election. This is the only time a parent and child have represented the same constituency at the same time in the same Dáil.

Barry was 22 years old at the time of her first election, and one of the youngest-ever TDs elected to the Dáil. She was re-elected at each successive election until she retired from politics at the 1987 general election, after seven years in the Dáil.  She retired after four successful election campaigns – topping the poll on each occasion – and still less than 30 years of age.

After politics, she qualified as a clinical psychologist.

References

See also
Families in the Oireachtas

1957 births
Living people
Alumni of St Patrick's College, Dublin
Fine Gael TDs
Irish schoolteachers
Members of the 21st Dáil
Members of the 22nd Dáil
Members of the 23rd Dáil
Members of the 24th Dáil
20th-century women Teachtaí Dála